Absolute Strangers is a 1991 made-for-television CBS docudrama featuring Happy Days star Henry Winkler returning to his first major TV role in eight years.
The screenplay, written by Robert Woodruff Anderson, was based on the true story of a husband's controversial decision to have his wife undergo an abortion to aid her recovery after a head-trauma accident had left her comatose.
The title is taken from the real-life court decision that used the phrase "absolute strangers", itself apparently derived from a courtroom outburst by the husband—to describe two anti-abortion activists, one of whom sued the husband to get custody of the fetus, the other to be appointed guardian of the comatose wife.

The impending broadcast of the film spurred anti-abortion activists, including the American Family Association, to try to discourage advertisers from buying time during the show.
These efforts provoked counter-demonstrations,
and campaigns of letter-writing in support of the broadcast from Planned Parenthood, the National Council of Jewish Women, and other groups.

The real-life husband, Martin Klein, appeared in a cameo. Henry Winkler played Martin Klein, with his wife Nancy played by Jennifer Hetrick. Others in the cast included Karl Malden as Nancy Klein's father, Patty Duke as the appeals court judge (personally opposed to abortion) in the pivotal court case, and Richard Kiley as a doctor who favors abortion in such cases.

The film's director, Gilbert Cates, was nominated for a Primetime Emmy.

Plot

Following a car accident, a husband is advised that only an abortion can save the life of his comatose and pregnant wife, and he reluctantly agrees to this. However the procedure is blocked by activists opposed to abortion. Eventually a court case allows the abortion to proceed.

Cast
  Henry Winkler as Marty Klein
  Patty Duke as Judge Ray
  Richard Kiley as Dr. R.J. Cannon
  Audra Lindley as Anne Zusselman
  Karl Malden as Fred Zusselman
  Jennifer Hetrick as Nancy Klein
  Jayne Atkinson as Eleanor Barcroft
  Doris Belack as Fran
  Vasili Bogazianos as Dr. Sears
  Ron Frazier as Davis
  Steven Gilborn as Dr. Dalton
  Tony Jay as Weisfeld
  James Karen as Dr. X 
  Alan Oppenheimer as Stevenson 
  René Auberjonois as Quinn 
  Mitchell Laurance as Stan

References

External links 
 

American docudrama films
Films about abortion
1991 television films
1991 films
CBS network films
Films scored by Charles Fox
Films directed by Gilbert Cates
American drama television films
1990s American films